was a  after Tenji and before Tenshō. This period spanned the years from January 1126 through January 1131.

Change of era
 January 25, 1126 : The new era name was created to mark an event or series of events. The previous era ended and the new one commenced in Tenji 3, on the 22nd day of the 1st month of 1126.

Events of the Daiji era
 1128 (Daiji 3, in the 3rd month): Taiken-mon In ordered the construction of Enshō-ji in fulfillment of a sacred vow. This was one in a series of "sacred vow temples" (gogan-ji) built by imperial command following a precedent established by Emperor Shirakawa, who established and developed the Hosshō-ji complex.
 1128 (Daiji 3, 6th month): Fujiwara Tadamichi is relieved of his responsibilities and duties as sesshō (regent); and simultaneously, Tadamichi is named kampaku.
 July 24, 1129 (Daiji 4, 7th day of the 7th month): The former-Emperor Shirakawa died at the age of 77.

Notes

References
 Brown, Delmer M. and Ichirō Ishida, eds. (1979).  Gukanshō: The Future and the Past. Berkeley: University of California Press. ;  OCLC 251325323
 Nussbaum, Louis-Frédéric and Käthe Roth. (2005).  Japan encyclopedia. Cambridge: Harvard University Press. ;  OCLC 58053128
 Titsingh, Isaac. (1834). Nihon Odai Ichiran; ou,  Annales des empereurs du Japon.  Paris: Royal Asiatic Society, Oriental Translation Fund of Great Britain and Ireland. OCLC 5850691
 Varley, H. Paul. (1980). A Chronicle of Gods and Sovereigns: Jinnō Shōtōki of Kitabatake Chikafusa. New York: Columbia University Press. ;  OCLC 6042764

External links
 National Diet Library, "The Japanese Calendar" -- historical overview plus illustrative images from library's collection

Japanese eras